Sebastian Thaler (born 27 September 1986 in Vienna) is a Cinematographer.

Life and career 
Thaler finished his master's degree in cinematography at the Film Academy of Vienna under the guidance of Walter Kindler and Michael Haneke in 2016. He learned from and worked with Ed Lachman as a camera assistant on several projects.

He was also working as a camera operator and/or 1st AC on documentaries and feature films with his father, Wolfgang Thaler, when he is shooting as DoP. With him he worked on films like „Import/Export“ or the „Paradise Trilogy“ by Ulrich Seidl as well as films by Michael Glawogger („Workingman's Death“).

Awards 
First Steps Award Germany 
 2015: Nominee: Michael-Ballhaus-Preis für Kameraabsolventen (Michael Ballhaus Award for Cinematography graduates)

Filmography as a Cinematographer 

 2015: Everything will be okay ( Dir.: Patrick Vollrath) Short
 2015: Man's Work ( Dir.: Marina Stepanska) Short
 2015: Forrest of Echos ( Dir.: Luz Olivares Capelle) Short
 2014: Hinter der Tür (Dir.: Patrick Vollrath) Short
 2013: Ketchup Kid (Dir.: Patrick Vollrath) Short

References 

1986 births
Austrian cinematographers
Living people